Utetheisa vollenhovii is a moth in the family Erebidae. It was described by Snellen in 1890. It is found on Sulawesi.

References

Moths described in 1890
vollenhovii